The 1919 Chattanooga Moccasins football team represented the University of Chattanooga (now known as the University of Tennessee at Chattanooga) as an independent during the 1919 college football season. In their first season under head coach Silas Williams, the Moccasins completed its nine-game schedule with a record of 3–5–1.

Schedule

References

Chattanooga
Chattanooga Mocs football seasons
Chattanooga Moccasins football